The BCW Can-Am Tag Team Championship is the tag team title contested for in the Ontario-based professional wrestling promotion Border City Wrestling.

Title history

Combined reigns

By team

By wrestler

Notes

See also

Professional wrestling in Canada

References
Specific

External links
 BCW Can-Am Tag Team Championship

Border City Wrestling championships
Tag team wrestling championships
International professional wrestling championships
North American professional wrestling championships